Splinters in the Air (aka, Splinters In The Air Force) is a 1937 British comedy film directed by Alfred J. Goulding and starring Sydney Howard and Richard Hearne. It is a loose sequel to the films Splinters (1929) and Splinters in the Navy (1931). It was made at Pinewood Studios.

Premise
An inventor is mistaken for his twin brother, and is forced to take his brother's place in the Royal Air Force.

Cast
 Sydney Howard as George Metcalfe / Sydney Metcalfe  
 Richard Hearne as Sgt. Hearne  
 Stuart Robertson as Sgt. Robertson  
 Ralph Reader as Sgt. Reader  
 Ellen Pollock as Charles' Wife  
 D. A. Clarke-Smith as Warrant Officer  
 Franklyn Bellamy as Charles - the C.O.  
 Ronald Ward as Richards  
 Binkie Stuart as Mary Dunwoody  
 Lew Lake as Lew - the Stage Manager 
 Geraldine Hislop as Maid

References

Bibliography
 Low, Rachael. Filmmaking in 1930s Britain. George Allen & Unwin, 1985.
 Wood, Linda. British Films, 1927-1939. British Film Institute, 1986.

External links
Splinters in the Air at IMDB

1937 films
British comedy films
1937 comedy films
Films shot at Pinewood Studios
Films directed by Alfred J. Goulding
British black-and-white films
1930s English-language films
1930s British films